Sichuan Province Prison Administrative Bureau (四川省监狱管理局) is the provincial prison service agency in Sichuan, China. It is headquartered in Chengdu.

Prisons

 Sichuan Provincial Women's Prison

See also
 Penal system in China

References

External links
 Sichuan Provincial Administration of Prisons 

Organizations with year of establishment missing
Organizations based in Chengdu
Organizations based in Sichuan
Provincial-level prison administrative bureaux in China